Piotr Sobociński (3 February 1958 – 26 March 2001) was a Polish cinematographer.  He was nominated for the Academy Award for Best Cinematography for Three Colours: Red in  1994. Sobociński was the son of Polish cinematographer Witold Sobociński.

Early life
Born in 1958, in Łódź, Poland, as a youngster, Sobociński felt led in his father's footsteps. He studied at the National Film School in Łódź and earned his degrees in 1987.

Career
He worked with noted Polish director, Krzysztof Kieślowski in many films, starting with Dekalog (1988) and culminating with Kieślowski's final film, Three Colours: Red (1994), for which Sobociński won his first award the Silver Frog Award at Camerimage, Poland's International Film Festival of the Art of Cinematography in 1994, as well as an Oscar nomination the same year. In the following year, he won the Golden Frog award for The Seventh Room and, in 1997, received a Golden Frog nomination for Marvin’s Room.

His career hit a peak in the mid-1990s when he was asked by Ron Howard to work on the film Ransom starring Mel Gibson and Rene Russo. However, while filming Trapped (aka 24 Hours) in 2001, he suffered a massive heart attack and died in his sleep in Vancouver, British Columbia, and was buried at the Powązki Military Cemetery in Warsaw, Poland.  Hearts in Atlantis, released a few months after his death, and Trapped are dedicated to him.

Filmography
Film

Television

References

External links

 
 Piotr Sobociński at Allmovie.
 Piotr Sobociński at cinematographers.nl.
 Piotr Sobociński at Internet Database of Polish Films''
 

1958 births
2001 deaths
Film people from Łódź
Polish cinematographers
Burials at Powązki Military Cemetery